This list is of the Historic Sites of Japan located within the Prefecture of Ishikawa.

National Historic Sites
As of 1 August 2019, twenty-six Sites have been designated as being of national significance, including the Kaga Domain Maeda Clan Graves and Kaetsu border castle ruins, which span the prefectural borders with Toyama.

|}

Prefectural Historic Sites
As of 1 May 2019, twenty-four Sites have been designated as being of prefectural importance.

Municipal Historic Sites
As of 1 May 2019, a further one hundred and seventy-seven Sites have been designated as being of municipal importance.

See also

 Cultural Properties of Japan
 Kaga Province
 Noto Province
 Ishikawa Prefectural History Museum
 List of Places of Scenic Beauty of Japan (Ishikawa)
 List of Cultural Properties of Japan - paintings (Ishikawa)

References

External links
  Cultural Properties of Ishikawa Prefecture

Ishikawa Prefecture
 Ishikawa